Cheema may refer to:

People 
 Cheema (surname) (including a list of people with the name)

Places

Punjab, India 
 Cheema, Sangrur, a town in Sangrur district
 Cheema, Dhuri, a village in Dhuri, Sangrur district
 Cheema, Gurdaspur, a village in Gurdaspur district
 Cheema, Barnala, a village in Barnala district

Pakistan 
Banka Cheema
Dilawar Cheema
Dilawar Cheema Kalan
Wadala Cheema
Kalaske Cheema
Jamke Cheema
Shamsa Cheema
Adamke Cheema
Baddoke Cheema
Sui Cheemian

See also 
 Chima (disambiguation)